HK Riga 2000 was an ice hockey team based in Riga, Latvia. The team had played in the LHL since it was founded. In 2004-05 and 2005-06 seasons the club also iced a team in the Belarusian Hockey League, and in 2005-06 finished 3rd. HK Riga 2000 was first foreign team to finish in top three of Belarusian Open Championship. The club has also played several years in the Continental Cup, winning silver in 2005-06 and 2007-08. Before the 2009-2010 KHL season the team was merged into HK Dinamo/Juniors Rīga, the farm club of KHL side Dinamo Rīga.

Notable players

Noteworthy Players
Artūrs Irbe
Kārlis Skrastiņš
Sergei Zholtok
Darby Hendrickson

Retired numbers
The Rīga 2000 have retired one number.

Awards and trophies
Latvian Hockey Higher League 
2000–01, 2003–04, 2004–05, 2005–06

References
HK Riga 2000 official web site

 
2000
Ice hockey clubs established in 2000
Belarusian Extraleague teams
Latvian Hockey League teams
Defunct ice hockey teams in Latvia
Eastern European Hockey League teams